The 6213/6214 Harbin-Daqing Through Train (Chinese: 6213/6214 次哈尔滨东到大庆西普通旅客列车) is a Chinese passenger train service running between Harbin to Daqing express passenger trains by the Harbin Railway Bureau, Harbin passenger segment responsible for passenger transport task, Habin originating on the Daqing train. 25B Type Passenger trains running along the Binzhou Railway across Heilongjiang provinces, the entire 157 km. Harbin East Railway Station to Daqing West Railway Station running 4 hours and 52 minutes, use trips for 6213; Daqing West Railway Station to Harbin East Railway Station to run 4 hours and 34 minutes, use trips for 6214.

See also 
K7051/7052 Harbin-Daqing Through Train
D7981/7982 Harbin-Daqing Through Train
D7983/7984 Harbin-Daqing Through Train
D7985/7986 Harbin-Daqing Through Train

References 

Passenger rail transport in China
Rail transport in Heilongjiang